St. Etchen (Etchenius, Ecian or Echen) (490 - 11 February 577) was an Irish Abbot who founded a monastery in Clonfad, County Westmeath.

Legend states that Etchen ordained Columba into the priesthood, and that he had to stop in the middle of ploughing a field to perform the act.

Veneration
A number of local schools and churches are named after St. Etchen, including:

 Church of St. Etchen, Killucan
 St. Etchen National School, Kinnegad

Death
Etchen died on 11 February 577AD of natural causes. He was buried at his monastery in Clonfad. His date is celebrated as the Feast of Saint Etchen in Ireland.

See also
Clonfad

References

Medieval Gaels from Ireland
People from County Westmeath
Irish abbots
Medieval Irish saints
490 births
577 deaths
Irish Christian missionaries